Sviatlana Kouhan (née Klimkovich - ; born 26 August 1980 in Nemanitsa) is a Belarusian long-distance runner. She competed in the marathon at the 2012 Summer Olympics, placing 34th with a time of 2:30:26.

References

1980 births
Living people
Belarusian female long-distance runners
Olympic athletes of Belarus
Athletes (track and field) at the 2012 Summer Olympics